The South Yorkshire Amateur Football League was a football competition for clubs in the Sheffield area of England. The competition was administered by the Sheffield and Hallamshire Football Association.

Honours

League champions

League Cup finals

References

External links
South Yorkshire Amateur Football League FA Full Time

 
Defunct football leagues in England
Defunct football competitions in South Yorkshire
1933 establishments in England
Sports leagues established in 1933
2016 disestablishments in England
Sports leagues disestablished in 2016